Louis Boutet de Monvel (22 June 1941 – 25 December 2014) was a French mathematician who worked on functional analysis.

He was a student of  Laurent Schwartz in Paris and was professor at the Pierre and Marie Curie University. He was married to Anne Boutet de Monvel, also a mathematician.

In 2007 he was awarded the Émile Picard Medal of the French Academy of Sciences and in 2003 the Prix de l'État.

According to the Mathematics Genealogy Project
 
his Ph.D. students are 
AbdelAli Attioui (1994), Jean-Marc Delort, 
Bernard Helffer (1976), 
Gilles Lebeau (1984), 
George Marinescu (1994), 
Philibert Nang (1996), 	
Serge Lukasiewicz (1997), 
Alexander Rezounenko (1997).

Publications

References

External links 
 
 Homepage at  Paris VI
 Conference in his honor 2003
 Conference in his honor 2016
 
 Louis Boutet de Monvel at Scopus (abstract and citation database)

École Normale Supérieure alumni
20th-century French mathematicians
2014 deaths
Fellows of the American Academy of Arts and Sciences
1941 births
21st-century French mathematicians